Brigitta Pallauf (born 26 November 1960) is an Austrian politician. She has been president of the Salzburg state parliament between 2013 and January 2018, and June 2018 to the present.

Life 
Pallauf attended the Gunskirchen primary school between 1967 and 1971 and later, until 1979, attended a girl's secondary school in Wels. She studied law at the University of Salzburg, and received her doctorate in 1983.

She then completed a postgraduate degree in European law at Hofen Castle from 1995 to 1996 and graduated in 1996 as an academically certified expert in European law.

Politics 

Since June 2007 she has been the financial officer of the Salzburg Women's ÖVP, and since 22 April 2009 she has led the ÖVP in the Salzburg State Parliament and has been the spokeswoman for art and music, women and civil relations.

On 15 January 2018, Hans Mayr tendered his resignation as regional councillor, and Pallauf followed, to become a state councillor.

References 

1960 births
Living people
Austrian politicians
Austrian women in politics